The Union of Agricultural and Forestry Workers (GLFG) was a trade union representing countryside workers in Austria.

The union was founded by the Austrian Trade Union Federation in 1945.  By 1990, it had only 18,387 members.  The following year, it merged with the Union of Workers in Food and Allied Industries, to form the Union of Agriculture, Food and Allied Industries.

Presidents
1945: Pius Schneeberger
1961: Herbert Pansi
Erich Dirngrabner

References

Agriculture and forestry trade unions
Trade unions established in 1945
Trade unions disestablished in 1991
Trade unions in Austria
1945 establishments in Austria
1991 disestablishments in Austria